Jacobus Hubertus "Bèr" Felix ( – ) was a Dutch footballer.

Club career
A big striker, Felix played the majority of his career for local side MVV. In a match with RFC Roermond in 1929, Felix got caught up in a brawl with Pierre Massy and became the first Dutch player to make his way to a civil judge for an incident during a football match.

International career
He was part of the Netherlands national football team, playing 1 match on 31 August 1919 against Norway. He was the first player from Limburg to play for the national team.

See also
 List of Dutch international footballers

References

External links
 

1895 births
1967 deaths
Association football forwards
Dutch footballers
Netherlands international footballers
NAC Breda players
MVV Maastricht players
Footballers from Maastricht